Data Smog is a 1997 book by journalist David Shenk and published by HarperCollins. It addresses the author's ideas on how the information technology revolution would shape the world, and how the large amount of data available on the Internet would make it more difficult to sift through and separate fact from fiction.

Argument of the book
According to Data Smog, with the advance of technology, we have been able to progress in terms of society, economy, and even health.  Communication is instantaneous, knowledge is abundant, and as humans we try to keep up with this expansion of data that continues to accumulate from around the world.

However, it is the overwhelming amount of information that is defined as data smog; "this unexpected, unwelcome part of our atmosphere, an expression for the noxious muck and druck of the Information age." The wealth of information is harming some because of sheer amount of it and rate of production: "The sheer volume of information which many of us are exposed to every day may actually impair our performance and add stress to our lives." In fact, according to statistics provided by Shenk, "In 1971 the average American was targeted by at least 560 daily advertising messages. Twenty years later, that number has risen six fold, to 3,000 messages per day."

It is argued that "Just as fat has replaced starvation as this nation’s number one dietary concern, information overload has replaced information scarcity as an important new emotional, social, and political problem."  As per David Lewis, PhD in psychology, this attempt at consuming the majority of data, the result is what he calls "information fatigue syndrome." This term refers to the data smog that we encounter daily that ultimately interferes with our sleep, concentration, and even affecting our immune systems.

According to clinical psychologist Michelle Weil "the problems stem from people’s overuse or misuse of technologies and from technology’s ineffective presentation of information, researchers are finding."

Suggested alleviation
Ways in which to 'beat the smog':

 Turn off the television for at least an hour or two every evening. 
 Spend some time each week without your pager or cell phone. 
 Resist advertising – never buy a product based on unsolicited email (spam). 
 Go on periodic "data fasts". A weekend in the country away from the telephone can rejuvenate a smogged-in brain. 
 Write clearly and succinctly. Verbose writing is wasteful and difficult to read. 
 Skim newsletters and magazines and rip out a copy of an article or two that you really want to read and digest. 
 Filter your email. Many email programs allow you to set "filters" which send unwanted email directly to the trash. It is worth taking the time to do this. 
 Do not forward chain letters, urban legends, urgent messages about email viruses, or claims that Bill Gates will send everyone thousands of dollars. These things clog up everybody's inbox with worthless stuff. 
 Organize your Web bookmarks or Favorites. Keeping these in meaningful folders will go a long way toward helping you really find that site you are looking for.

Neologism
In 2004, Shenk's original term "data smog" was added to the Oxford English Dictionary

References 

1997 non-fiction books